The Russia men's national tennis team until it was suspended in 2022 represented Russia in Davis Cup tennis competition. It is governed by the Russian Tennis Federation. The team started playing in 1993.

Russia has won the Davis Cup twice, in 2002 and 2006. In addition, the team of the Russian Tennis Federation (RTF) won the Davis Cup in 2021. Russia finished as runner-up three times, in 1994, 1995, and 2007.

Russia was suspended after the 2022 Russian invasion of Ukraine.



Last team
The following players were called up for the 2021 Davis Cup Finals in November 2021.

History
Russia competed in its first Davis Cup in 1962, as the Soviet Union, until 1991, and in 1992 under the name of CIS.  Russia played a total of 117 series, of which they won 77 and lost 40.  It won the Cup twice – in 2002 and 2006.  In 1994, 1995 and 2007 the team played in the final – against Sweden and USA, the latter two.

Russia was the top-ranked country in the Davis Cup standings in 2009, but were upset by Israel in their quarterfinal tie in July 2009, on indoor hard courts at the Nokia Arena in Tel Aviv.

Since their loss against Sweden in the first round of the 2011 Davis Cup, team Russia did not return to the World Group, and after the heavy loss at the 2012 WG Play-offs against Brazil, 0–5, it played in the Europe/Africa Zone Group I. Russia managed to advance to the WG play-offs in 2015, but lost to Italy, 1–4.

With the win over Sweden in the 2016 Europe Zone Group I, Shamil Tarpishchev made a record of 55 Davis Cup wins as team captain.

Recent performances
Here is the list of all match-ups since the 1990s.

1990s

2000s

2010s

Results

Notes

See also
Davis Cup
Russia Billie Jean King Cup team

External links

References

Davis Cup teams
Davis Cup